Agustín Alarcón Vargas (born 12 January 1962) is a Spanish rower. He competed in the men's coxed four event at the 1988 Summer Olympics.

References

External links
 
 
 

1962 births
Living people
Spanish male rowers
Olympic rowers of Spain
Rowers at the 1988 Summer Olympics
Sportspeople from Barakaldo
Rowers from the Basque Country (autonomous community)